The Islamic Azad University, Zanjan Branch (informally Islamic Azad University of Zanjan) is a private research university in Zanjan, Iran.

History
The university was founded in 1985 and admitted 175 students on that year. The university initially began its operation by renting a  building located in the main square of Zanjan.

Faculties and Departments

The Islamic Azad University of Zanjan is divided into five faculties, each sub-divided into schools.

Faculty of Technology and Engineering

Department of Architecture

Department of Civil engineering

Department of Geodesy

Department of Urban Studies

Department of Materials & Metallurgy engineering

Department of Transportation

Department of Soil Sciences

Department of Mechanical Engineering

Faculty of Electrical and Computer Engineering

Department of Electrical Engineering

Department of Computer Engineering

Department of Information Technology

Department of Industrial Engineering

Faculty of Educational Sciences

Department of Physical Education and Sport Sciences

Department of Theology

Department of Psychology

Department of English Language

Faculty of Foundation and Medical Sciences

Department of Midwifery

Department of Nursing

Department of Biological Sciences(Genetics, Animal, Micro)

Department of Chemistry

Department of Physics

Department of Statistics

Faculty of Humanities
The faculty was founded in 2009 and is located in Emam campus.

Department of linguistics and Persian Literature

Department of Political Sciences

Department of International Relations

Department of Commercial Management

Department of Accountancy

Department of Law and Justice

Department of Social Sciences

Department of Banking and Insurance

Research & Facilities
The unit began its work in October 1389. Science Research Unit completed its move to the desired location.

Education
Branch unit of 45 major courses of study in 1384 to over 127 students in 1389 has increased. The number of students over the same period of 8988 students has increased to over 13 150 students.

Qualitative increase in the battle takes place simultaneously with a small increase in Zanjan unit and the two essential and interdependent.has.

Number of scholars in 1385, 45 cases in 1389, this number has risen to 90 people.

Islamic Azad University, with five of Humanities and Social Sciences, Faculty of Educational Sciences, Faculty of Science and Medicine, School of Electrical and Computer Engineering and the School is active.

Field research
Two fundamental pillars of education and research are both necessary and concomitant factors. Without proper training, research and research training objectives have been drawn without the production of science and technology will be terminated. Double steps have been taken to promote research in Zanjan unit. Quantitative and qualitative indicators indicate the seriousness of the unit's research activities.recognized and awarded a plaque of appreciation from the President of Islamic Republic of Iran.

Branch of ISI papers from 27 papers so far in 2004 has reached 110 articles.

Branch unit number printed books as a textbook is about 52. Branch unit number printed books as a textbook is about 52. Branch unit number of 70 thousand volumes of books in libraries in 1384 to over 150,000 thousand volumes have already increased.

Development areas

Over the past five years the capacity of 45 thousand square meters of teaching space and recreation department has increased to more than 135 200 thousand square meters. Branch units with three large residential complexes, the largest dormitory complex in the country. Residential complex in Al-Zahra (SA), the residential complex of M (Q) and residential complexes equipped martyr Avini of accommodation facilities are in the region and country.

Portal conferences and Islamic Azad University, Zanjan
New portal: portal conferences and Islamic Azad University, Zanjan University is the base for centralized management of scientific events. In addition to introducing this database conferences, all the processes related to the Conference of the call, get the judge to define the workshops, the registration and Ntayh and arbitration, all to be done online and virtual.

See also
 University of Zanjan
 Institute for Advanced Studies in Basic Sciences

External links
 https://web.archive.org/web/20070101135644/http://www.azu.ac.ir/
 https://web.archive.org/web/20120408184346/http://conferences.azu.ac.ir/
 https://web.archive.org/web/20120415154755/http://znj.srbiau.ac.ir/

Education in Zanjan Province
Zanjan, Islamic Azad University of
Buildings and structures in Zanjan Province